Tasmanian Devil is a fictional character, a superhero in the DC Comics universe. He first appeared in Super Friends #7. His first canon appearance is Infinity, Inc. #32 (November 1986).

He is unrelated to the Looney Tunes character, although both characters are owned by divisions of WarnerMedia.

Fictional character biography
Hugh Dawkins is a born metahuman with the ability to turn into a supernaturally large and intelligent Tasmanian Devil, in a fashion similar to a werewolf. An alternate origin has jokingly been offered, claiming that Hugh's mother was a were-Tasmanian Devil who raised him in a Tasmanian Devil cult, which gave him a Tasmanian Devil amulet after selling his soul to a Tasmanian Devil and injecting him with a radioactive Tasmanian Devil musk from a race of alien Tasmanian Devils which gave him his powers. While Hugh is a pacifist, his alter ego of the Tasmanian Devil is aggressive and bestial. His parents had a hard time with him until he saved his father's life.

He works as a superhero in Tasmania until he is contacted by a man named Doctor Mist to join the Global Guardians. He fights alongside the team and other heroes. In one incident, a team up with Infinity Inc. goes bad when Taz is mentally forced to help a murderous villain gain revenge on a casino. Later, the Guardians' base is destroyed and the team disbands.

League and Guardians
Dawkins helps to rebuild the Justice League Embassy which had been destroyed during an alien invasion. His affiliation with the Justice League causes his rejection by the Queen Bee, ruler of Bialya, who is reforming the Guardians. Her efforts seem beneficial but are for her own selfish gain, as she is using brainwashing techniques to put the Guardians under her control. This affects the Devil again, as his close friend Tuatara falls into a coma after destroying a neo-Nazi compound and attacking the League. Tuatara receives care by an Australian medical facility.

Dawkins and his friend Joshua Barbazon are preparing the Justice League Australian embassy. Their plans include transferring Tuatara to the medical lab, as soon as it is completed. The Queen Bee recalls Tuatara before this happens. Dawkins is infuriated by these circumstances, which he doesn't fully understand.

Dawkins would be there when Tuatara recovers his true mind. Called up in a League effort to stop an international incident, Dawkins and many other League members travel to Bialya. It turns out that Captain Atom, Elongated Man, Ice, and Blue Beetle had been fired by Ambassador Heimlich, a mole placed into UN power by the Queen Bee. They had illegally invaded Bialya to investigate.

The backup team enters, with the permission of Queen Bee, just in time to be caught in a devastating explosion, which destroys an entire city block. The League and many innocent people are saved by Ice creating a shield, but so many others are not so lucky. Dawkin's former friends regain their minds, and the Bee's massive brainwashing efforts are uncovered. He also learns that Doctor Mist was a robot, Jack O'Lantern is dead but an impostor, and Owlwoman is missing. It's said that Little Mermaid is also missing, though both sides in the conflict had seen her die from a misfired shot by Lantern. Queen Bee, the one that has caused so much problems is deposed and slain by Sumaan Harjavti, the brother of the man the Queen had slain and deposed.

Dawkins and the League help with relief and recovery efforts. After this he would return to Australia, but he rejoins a team of Guardians to rescue those still endangered by the secret machinations of Harjavti. The entire group is endangered as those left behind had been implanted with subliminal orders to kill. Fortunately, nobody is actually harmed and the Guardians are reformed again. Taz assists with clean up efforts after Coast City is obliterated.

He rejoins Justice League International after aiding them against the villain Sonar. He is present for the funeral of fellow Leaguer Ice. He becomes indirectly involved in another recruitment effort but it doesn't work out.

It is also revealed that Hugh is openly gay in Justice League Quarterly #8 (1992). He has previously been romantically interested in JLA liaison Joshua Barbizon, had a crush on Hal Jordan and is dating Starman, Mikaal Thomas.
r

Bloodlines
Later, Dawkins works with the Justice League during the Bloodlines event. He teams up, mainly with Elongated Man and Metamorpho to stop a group of murderous aliens terrorizing London. The other adult female team members, Power Girl and Doctor Light, are unavailable to assist due to previous commitments. The men are not very successful as dozens of citizens vanish or are killed. The toll, which includes a missing school bus, deeply affects all three. During one investigation, they are attacked by the rookie armored hero Lionheart, who mistakes Taz's unusual form (and the changing forms of his friends) for the eyewitness reports of the aliens.

The aliens attack the League's headquarters, a (seemingly haunted) castle. Summoned by the energy flares of their youngest member, Maya, the group returns and fights the creatures. Lionheart, though his secondary mission is to discredit the League, sees the nobility in Taz and the others and helps them chase off the aliens. No pursuit is possible, as all are injured; Taz himself has been impaled through the shoulder. Lionheart, before fainting from his injuries, summons medical help through an emergency Justice League communications channel. Taz recovers in time to help his JLE teammates and dozens of other heroes defeat the Bloodlines aliens. The aliens are destroyed in a swamp outside of Metropolis in America.

Funerals and Risk
Around this time, Dawkins goes on a JLI goodwill tour to New Zealand. They resist him at first. He and his contact, Raylene Mackenzie, stumble upon the villain Phobia and Tas literally sniffs out one of her recent murders. The two get into a back-and-forth fight with the fear-casting killer. Raylene confronts a fear of drowning, while Tas' hallucination concerns the abusive treatment his mother heaped upon his father. Working together, the two defeat Phobia. Tas' efforts to save a New Zealander endears him to the entire country.

Dawkins later assists the Justice League in battling Overmaster. There, the team loses Ice. The group falls apart, and Dawkins soon leaves too, not wanting to stay in a group so small and unestablished. He does not see the point.

Tas is one of the mourners at the funeral for Maxwell Lord. After some time missing, he is shown attending the funeral of Sue Dibny, wife of the Elongated Man.

He joins the Ultramarine Corps and lives for a time on their floating city of Superbia. When the entire city is conquered by Gorilla Grodd and his forces, Tas and the other surviving heroes are sent to cause destruction. His mind and the Corps are rescued by the Justice League. Soon after, he takes part in the Corps' mission into the infant universe sometimes known as Nebula Man. Their efforts later allow the villain to be destroyed.

Tas helps out in the OMAC Crisis. He is one of many superheroes who go to the Sahara as bait for the legions of meta-human killing machines. This scheme works, and many OMACs are destroyed without harming the hosts within.

After the events of Infinite Crisis, Tas is shown at a memorial service/headcount. During the 52 maxi-series, Tas and other powered beings, including Gloss and Manticore, face a rage-maddened Black Adam in Sydney, Australia. They are shown unconscious and buried in debris.

Later, Tas once again rejoins the Global Guardians.

In Detective Comics #852 (2008), Tas makes a brief appearance fighting hostile gunmen on the streets of Australia.

Death and return
In the 2009 mini-series Justice League: Cry for Justice, it is revealed that Tas was skinned, and his pelt was made into a rug by the villain Prometheus.

In the 2011 Starman/Congorilla one-shot, it is revealed that Prometheus had his body put into a stasis pod. He was fully healed and awakened after a citizen of Gorilla City named Malavar placed his comatose body in a Lazarus Pit. He rises from the Pit just in time to help Starman, Congorilla, Malavar and Animal Man fight a group of enemies, and then returns to Australia to tell his mother that he is still alive.

Following his resurrection, Tas appears as a member of the Justice League's reserve roster during the battle against Eclipso's shadow army.

The New 52 and DC Rebirth
In Midnighter and Apollo it is implied that he is not only resurrected, but married to Gregorio de la Vega, who refers to his husband as a therianthrope and named Hugh. This is confirmed in the DC Pride anthology, in which Hawkins debuts as part of the Justice League Queer, which is brought together by his husband to defeat Eclipso.

In the Watchmen sequel Doomsday Clock, Tasmanian Devil is listed as a member of the Australian superhero team called the Sleeping Soldiers.

Powers and abilities
Hugh Dawkins can turn into a large Tasmanian devil. In this form, he possesses super strength, savage claws, advanced healing, razor sharp fangs and the ability to grow larger in size.

References

External links
 Tasmanian Devil at DC Comics Wiki
 Tasmanian Devil at Comic Vine
 Gay League Profile

Australian superheroes
Comics characters introduced in 1977
DC Comics characters who are shapeshifters
DC Comics characters who can move at superhuman speeds
DC Comics characters with accelerated healing
DC Comics characters with superhuman senses
DC Comics characters with superhuman strength
DC Comics LGBT superheroes
DC Comics male superheroes
DC Comics metahumans
Fictional characters who can change size
Fictional gay males
Fictional people from Tasmania
Fictional Tasmanian devils
Fictional therianthropes
Fictional pacifists